Sir John Mill, 1st Baronet (1 April 1587 – 1648) was an English politician who sat in the House of Commons  at various times between 1624 and 1640.

Mill was the younger son of Lewknor Mill, of Camois Court and his wife, Cicely (or Cecily, daughter of John Crook of Southampton), and educated in the law at Gray's Inn. He succeeded his elder brother in 1587 and was created a baronet of Camois Court on 3 December 1619. He inherited the manors of Newton Bury and Fullerton.

In 1624, Mill was elected Member of Parliament for Southampton and re-elected for the same constituency in 1625 and 1626. In April 1640 he was again re-elected MP for Southampton in the Short Parliament. He was appointed High Sheriff of Hampshire for 1627–28.

Mill married twice; firstly Elizabeth More, daughter of Sir George More, of Loseley Park, but she died without issue and  secondly, Anne Fleming, daughter of Sir Thomas Fleming, Lord Chief Justice of England, with whom he had several children. His eldest son Sir John Mill was killed fighting on the Royalist side in the English Civil War and had married Philadelphia Knollys, daughter of Sir Henry Knollys, of Grove Place, Hampshire, comptroller of the household to Charles I. Their son, Sir John Mill, 2nd Baronet, succeeded his grandfather in the baronetcy and inherited his (sequestered) estates.

References

 

|-

1587 births
1648 deaths
Members of Gray's Inn
Baronets in the Baronetage of England
English MPs 1624–1625
English MPs 1625
English MPs 1626
English MPs 1640 (April)
High Sheriffs of Hampshire